Maghnia (formerly Marnia) is a town in Tlemcen Province, northwestern Algeria. It is the second most populated town in Tlemcen Province, after Tlemcen. The current population is over 200,000.

History
Archaeologists have found evidence of prehistoric people in the area, who were displaced by the Phoenicians. The remnants of burned Ancient Roman military posts were discovered by the French army in 1836, when they entered the area; these posts were occupied, according to the inscriptions, by the numerus Severianus Alexandrinus Syrorum, a unit of Syrian archers. As such, it was the westernmost outpost of Mauretania Caesariensis.

Due to its convenient geographical location—within the watershed of Wadi Tafna on the route to Fes from Tlemcen, Maghnia later served as a marketplace for regional nomads.

Notable people

Ahmed ben Bella, the first President of independent Algeria, was born in Maghnia in 1916.
Sid Ahmed Ghozali, politician
Emma Vecla (1877–1972), French operatic soprano
Mahboub Bachir, Moudjahid

References

Communes of Tlemcen Province
Algeria–Morocco border crossings
Algeria
Cities in Algeria